Ben Stephens may refer to:
 Ben Stephens (basketball) (1916–1966), American basketball player
 Ben Stephens (baseball) (1867–1896), American baseball player
 Ben Stephens, Lord Stephens of Creevyloughgare, Northern Ireland judge
 Ben Stephens (footballer) (born 1997), English footballer

See also
Benjamin Stevens (disambiguation)
Stephens (surname)